Laurence Auzière-Jourdan (born 26 April 1977) is a French cardiologist and stepdaughter of French President Emmanuel Macron, for whom she campaigned in the 2017 French presidential election.

Early life and education
Auzière-Jourdan was born in 1977 to André-Louis Auzière, a banker, and Brigitte Trogneux. Her family lived in Truchtersheim, a French city near the German border, until 1991. She was a classmate of Emmanuel Macron at the Lycée la Providence in Amiens, France. She has an older brother, Sébastien, an engineer, and a younger sister, Tiphaine, a lawyer.

Auzière-Jourdan graduated from Pierre and Marie Curie University (UPMC University of Paris VI).

Career
Auzière-Jourdan practices high-risk cardiology and vascular diseases in Vincennes and Nogent-sur-Marne. She practices with cardiologists Didier Catuli and Pierre Sablon. She has published research in cardiology, including "Facteurs échographiques associés à un niveau de BNP élevé chez les insuffisants cardiaques: interaction systole diastole. (2004)"

Political activity
During the 2017 campaign of En Marche! presidential candidate Emmanuel Macron, she campaigned for her stepfather. Macron married Auzière-Jourdan's mother, Trogneux in 2007, after the two met each other when Macron was a 15-year-old student. At first, Macron's parents thought he was interested in Auzière-Jourdan, after she remarked that there was a boy in her class who "knows everything about everything" but later found out that Macron was interested in Auzière-Jourdan's mother.

Personal life
Auzière-Jourdan married Guillaume Jourdan, a radiologist practicing in Meaux.  They have three children.

References

 

1977 births
Living people
People from Bas-Rhin
People from Amiens
Academic staff of the University of Paris
French cardiologists
Women cardiologists
Macron family